Marta Volonteri, is an Italian astrophysicist and director of research specializing in black holes. She directs her research at the Institut d'Astrophysique de Paris. In 2022, she received the CNRS silver medal.

Life 
In 2003, Marta Volonteri defended her doctoral thesis at the University of Milan. She then carried out her postdoctoral research at the University of California, Santa Cruz, and then at the Institute of Astronomy, Cambridge. In 2007, she was appointed assistant professor at the University of Michigan. In 2010, she became associate professor. In 2012, she joined the CNRS as research director at the Institut d'astrophysique de Paris. She is responsible for the Astrophysics working group of the Laser Interferometer Space Antenna mission, the large space observatory of gravitational waves of the European Space Agency, whose launch is scheduled for 2032.

She received the CNRS Silver Medal in 2022 for her work on supermassive black holes located at the center of many galaxies. She uses computer simulation to build theoretical predictions of the formation and evolution of these black holes.

References

External links 
 http://www2.iap.fr/users/volonter/

Living people
Italian astrophysicists
Women astrophysicists
21st-century Italian physicists
21st-century Italian women scientists
University of Milan alumni
University of California, Santa Cruz people
University of Michigan faculty
French National Centre for Scientific Research scientists
Year of birth missing (living people)